Panay is a 2015 feature film directed by Taiwanese director Cheng Yu-Chieh and Lekal Sumi Cilangasan. It is inspired by a true story.

Panay is a very common female name among the Taiwanese Indigenous tribe, it simply stands for the beautiful spike of rice.

This is one of the few Taiwanese movies that filmed from an indigenous perspective. Through the cross ethnic cooperation between two directors, Cheng Yu-Chieh (Han) and Lekal Sumi (Pangcah). Actors are mostly new to the stage, they are fresh yet persuasive. The movie was being awarded the Audience Choice Award from the Taipei Film Festival. Panay's theme song "Aka pisawad" won the Best Original Film Song of the 52nd Golden Horse Awards.

Plot 
Panay worked in the city as a journalist. One day, she found her tribe has been overdeveloped and changed by tourism. They were losing their land and their culture, so she decided to return home to bring back the abandon terrace. In the process, she found it’s not only about the land, but also about who she really is.

Cast

Productions
Production Credits

Reception
Three general comments from three media about the movie are as follow:

and 
and the movie also received a number of accolades.

Awards

References

External links
 

2015 films